Little Red may refer to:

Little Red (album), a 2014 album by Katy B
Little Red (band), a rock band from Australia
Little Red (Saranac Lake, New York), a historic cottage
Virgin Atlantic Little Red, a defunct airline subsidiary
Crimson (wrestler) (born 1985), also known as Little Red

See also

Lil' Red, University of Nebraska–Lincoln sports mascot